Salvador Roman Hidalgo Laurel  (November 18, 1928 – January 27, 2004), also known as Doy Laurel, was a Filipino lawyer and politician who served as the vice president of the Philippines from 1986 to 1992 under President Corazon Aquino and briefly served as the last prime minister from February 25 to March 25, 1986, when the position was abolished. He was a major leader of the United Nationalist Democratic Organization (UNIDO), the political party that helped topple the dictatorship of President Ferdinand Marcos with the 1986 People Power Revolution.

Early life 
Salvador Laurel was the fifth son and eighth child of José P. Laurel, who served as president during the Second Philippine Republic. Salvador was born to a family whose lineage spans generations of public servants. His grandfather, Sotero Remoquillo Laurel, was both a delegate to the Malolos Congress in 1899 and secretary of the interior in the first Philippine revolutionary government under President Emilio Aguinaldo.

Laurel first enrolled at Centro Escolar de Señoritas, where he studied from 1933 to 1935. Laurel's father wanted Laurel to experience a public school education and so enrolled him first in the Paco Elementary School (1935–36) and then the Justo Lukban Elementary School (1936–37). He finished elementary schooling at Ateneo de Manila Grade School in 1941. In his first year of high school, Laurel received second honors, with a general average of 93.4. Barely three months later, his studies came to an abrupt halt with the outbreak of the war in the Pacific Theater on December 8, 1941. The school was temporarily closed by the Japanese government as run by American Jesuits, which prompted Laurel to enroll at De La Salle College High School, where he graduated in 1946.

Laurel was a member of Upsilon Sigma Phi during his university studies.

Stay in Japan 

Towards the end of the war, the Japanese Supreme War Council issued an order to have officials of the Philippine government flown to Japan. President Laurel volunteered to go alone to spare his Cabinet members the ordeal of being separated from their families. His wife, Paciencia, and seven of his children went with him. Among the officials who accompanied him were former Speaker of the National Assembly Benigno Aquino Sr., former Minister of Education Camilo Osias and his wife, and General Mateo Capinpin. On March 22, 1945, the group evacuated from Baguio and began a long and perilous overland journey to Tuguegarao, where a Japanese navy plane would fly the group to Japan via Formosa (now Taiwan) and Shanghai, China. The odyssey ended in Nara, where they were confined until November 10, 1945.

The long confinement gave the romantic and impressionable 15-year-old Salvador the luxury of time to write poetry and prose and satisfy his insatiable thirst for books. Whenever he was lucky to find an English book, he would read it voraciously and discuss it with his mentor, Camilo Osias. However, his most treasured moments in Nara were those spent with his father, enjoying their daily morning walks in the park when José would discuss his views on life.

On September 15, 1945, his father Jose P. Laurel, his older brother Jose Laurel III, and Benigno Aquino Sr. were arrested by a group of Americans headed by a Colonel Turner and were taken to Yokohama prison. The Laurel family, except for the former president and Jose III, was flown to Manila two months later on November 2, 1945.

Return to Manila 

Christmas 1945 was the bleakest one for the Laurel family; their Peñafrancia home was looted and emptied of its furniture, while the former president was placed in solitary confinement in Sugamo Prison in Japan. Salvador gifted his father a book entitled The World in 2030 A.D. by the Earl of Birkenhead. Lacked in writing instruments, he used that book to write his Memoirs. He also wrote the poem To My Beloved Father to lift up his father's spirits and sent it to him as a Christmas present.

At La Salle, he joined a group of young men who planned to go by sea to the Dutch East Indies (Indonesia since 1949) and join Sukarno in the struggle for independence from the Dutch Empire, but local authorities stopped them at the pier. He completed his secondary education at La Salle in March 1946.

His father Jose P. Laurel and brother Jose III would finally return to the Philippines on July 23, 1946.

Although all his older brothers were lawyers, he enrolled at the University of the Philippines as a premedicine student, where he obtained his AA (pre-medicine) and was admitted to medicine proper, shifting to law two years later. He was admitted to the law school while working to complete his (AA Pre-Law). He received his LLB (Bachelor of Laws) degree in UP in March 1952. He was a member of the Student Editorial Board of the Philippine Law Journal.

He was acclaimed the University Champion Orator after he won the first prize in three consecutive inter-university oratorical contests: the 1949 Inter-University Oratorical contest sponsored by the Civil Liberties Union; the Student Councils Association of the Philippines, and the Inter-University Symposium on the Japanese Peace Treaty in 1951.

Without waiting for the results of the bar examination, he left for Connecticut to study at Yale University, his father's alma mater where he earned his Master of Laws degree in 1952. He earned the title Doctor of Juridical Science at Yale University in 1960.

Of his studies and scholastic endeavors at Yale University, Myres S. McDougal, a Sterling Professor of Law, Emeritus of the Yale Law School, wrote:

Personal life 
Laurel later married Celia Díaz (May 29, 1928 - July 12, 2021) in 1950, a society debutante. He was the grandfather of actress Denise Laurel. He had a daughter who is also an actress, Pia Pilapil, to a veteran actress Pilar Pilapil.

Legal career 
In Manila, Laurel joined his brothers in the Laurel Law Offices in Intramuros. During his early years as a barrister, he became deeply involved with legal aid. He was appalled to discover that 94% of the cases filed by indigents in the fiscal's office were dismissed for lack of counsel. This led him to found Citizen's Legal Aid Society of the Philippines (CLASP) in 1967.

He campaigned throughout the country, convincing lawyers to join him in his quest to bring justice to the poor, and by the end of that first year, 750 lawyers had joined CLASP. For his brilliant record as “Defender of the Defenseless,” the young Laurel was awarded "Lawyer of the Year 1967" by the Justice and Court Reporters Association (JUCRA).

Years later, in 1976, no less than the International Bar Association honored him with the "Most Outstanding Legal Aid Lawyer of the World" award in Stockholm. Recalls Laurel: "I went to Stockholm alone...We were more than four hundred lawyers from eighty countries all over the globe at that assembly, presided over by Sir William Carter of England. When I was announced as the awardee of the year – the Most Outstanding Legal Aid Lawyer of the World – I couldn't believe it. I was cited for founding CLASP, for having been involved in legal aid since 1966, for the justice-of-the-poor laws I had pushed through in Congress, and for continuing to champion human rights despite the imposition of martial law."

A legal scholar and a professor of law the Lyceum University, Laurel edited the Proceedings of the Philippine Constitutional Convention (1934–1935) in seven (7) volumes based on and faithfully reproduced from the personal record kept by his father, Dr. Jose P. Laurel, a delegate from Batangas to the said Convention. These massive tomes were published in 1966.

Political career

Senator 
It was not until 1967 that Salvador H. Laurel seriously entered politics, when he won a Senate seat in the sixth Congress. He officially took his oath of office as senator on December 30, 1967. At 39 years old (38 at the time of his election), Laurel became the youngest Nacionalista senator in post-war history – a record that would be held for the next forty years.

In the Senate, he authored five "justice for the poor laws" also known as "Laurel laws."

1.  R.A. 6033, requiring courts to give priority to cases involving poor litigants;

2. R.A. 6034, giving free meals, travel and lodging allowances to poor litigants and their witnesses;

3. R.A. 6035, providing free transcript of stenographic notes to poor litigants;

4. R.A. 6036, dispensing with bail in minor cases; and

5. R.A. 6127, crediting prisoners with the full period (only one-half under previous law) of their detention in the service of prison terms

Laurel also authored nine judicial reform laws from 1968 to 1970; the Government Reorganization Act; and amendments to the Land Reform Code, one of which created the Department of Agrarian Reform.

As chairman of the Senate Committee on Justice, Laurel reported on the Administration of Justice in Central Luzon (1969); the State of the Philippine Penal Institution and Penology (1969); the Criminal Jurisdiction Provisions of the RP-US Military Bases Agreement (1969); the Dissident Problem in Central Luzon (1971); and Violations of Civil Liberties in the case of the "Golden Buddha" (1971).

Laurel helped represent the country in numerous international assemblies. He was sent to the United Nations General Assembly three times and to the Inter-Parliamentary Union Conference in Lima, Peru, in 1968. Later, when he was elected member of the interim National Assembly in 1978, Laurel was designated as head of the Philippine delegation to the First General Assembly of the ASEAN Inter-Parliamentary Organization in Singapore.

In 1972, Senator Laurel was the first high-ranking Filipino government official to visit the People's Republic of China (PRC). He was met by Premier Zhou Enlai, Vice Premier (later President) Li Xiannian, and other high officials of the Chinese government. Upon his return, he submitted an extensive report to the Senate on his China visit. He strongly advocated for the resumption of friendly ties with the PRC and the adoption of the One-China Policy, which eventually became the official stand of the Philippines.

Laurel was voted the "Most Outstanding Senator" from 1968–1971.

Freedom fighter

During martial law, Laurel enaged in fiery speeches that exhorted the people not to be afraid and to join him in the fight to restore democracy.

Through his leadership, he succeeded in organizing the United Nationalist Democratic Organization (UNIDO), drawing within its ambit leaders such as Cesar Climaco, Soc Rodrigo, Gerardo Roxas, Dominador Aytona, Eva Estrada Kalaw, Rene Espina, Mamintal Tamano, Domocao Alonto and his nephew Abul Khayr, Raul Gonzalez, Homobono Adaza and Abe Sarmiento and all significant political parties who were opposed to the dictatorship. The UNIDO was the political party that ended the dictatorship.

The UNIDO national convention

Laurel's unquestioned and courageous leadership earned him the unanimous endorsement of his party, the UNIDO. During the UNIDO national convention at the Araneta Coliseum on June 12, 1985, nearly 25,000 delegates attended and proclaimed him the party standard-bearer in the snap election against President Ferdinand E. Marcos. Corazon Aquino, widow of Ninoy Aquino, spoke before the huge assembly endorsing Laurel's candidacy. Five months later, however, she declared her own candidacy causing a major crisis in the opposition – a rift that could cause its downfall and ensure a Marcos victory.

A series of meetings were arranged between the two opposition candidates to iron out their differences but up to the third meeting the impasse could not be broken. Cory, backed by the Convenors group, was determined to run for president. Finally, Laurel said he would agree to run as her vice president provided she ran under the UNIDO banner but Cory refused. Laurel immediately filed his certificate of candidacy as president at the Commission on Elections.

1986 Snap Elections

However, Cory sent Ninoy's sister, Lupita Kashiwahara to inform Laurel that she had changed her mind – she was willing to run under the UNIDO. True to his word and anxious to keep the opposition united in order to win the snap elections, Laurel made the supreme sacrifice of giving up his lifetime's work and presidential ambition to give way to Corazon C. Aquino.

The Cory–Doy campaign vigorously began and on February 25, 1986, they took their oaths, respectively, as president and vice president of the Philippines at the Club Filipino.

Vice president and prime minister 

For a month following the People Power Revolution in late February 1986, Laurel became the only person in Philippine history to hold the posts of vice president, prime minister, and foreign minister concurrently. The office of prime minister was abolished in late March 1986.

Secretary of foreign affairs

As secretary of foreign affairs from February 1986 to September 1987, Vice President Laurel represented the Philippines in various international conferences attended by the heads of state. His official visit to China in 1986 was hailed as the "milestone marking the re-orientation of Philippine foreign policy". For his services, Laurel received on June 21, 1996, the Gawad Mabini Award, with the highest rank of dakilang kamaong; awarded the grand cross of the Order of Isabella the Catholic by King Juan Carlos I of Spain in 1986; and awarded the grand cross of the Order of Liberty and Unity from the Association for the Unity of Latin America in 1993 in New York.

He resigned from the Cabinet as secretary of foreign affairs on September 8, 1987, citing as his reasons "fundamental differences on moral principles" with President Corazon Aquino. He was succeeded by Raul Manglapus in October 1987.

1992 presidential elections 
In 1992, Laurel ran for president (under the banner of the Nacionalista Party) and lost in a field of seven contenders. This was his first and only electoral defeat since 1967.

Post-vice presidency 
In 1993, Laurel was appointed by President Ramos to be chairman of the National Centennial Commission in the run-up to the Philippine Centennial celebrations of the country's independence on June 12, 1898.

Laurel was supposed to resign after the centennial celebrations, but President Joseph Estrada extended his term and abolished the commission only in 1999. A few months after, Laurel was charged with graft before the Sandiganbayan (political antigraft court) for misappropriating funds for constructing of the controversial, ₱1.165-billion Centennial Expo in the Clark Freeport Zone in Angeles City. Laurel vehemently denied the allegation and chose to stand as his own defense counsel.

The charges, however, were eventually proved groundless in court.

Later life and death 

Following his retirement from public service in 1999, Laurel devoted much of his time to law practice, international consultancy, free legal aid, and writing books. He also busied himself with the Nacionalista Party, of which he was president.

In June 2003, Laurel flew to the United States to seek medical intervention after he was diagnosed with cancer of the lymph nodes. He died on January 27, 2004, in his rented home in Atherton, California. He was 75 at the time of his death. His remains were cremated days afterward. On January 29, President Gloria Macapagal Arroyo issued Presidential Proclamation No. 544, declaring seven days of official mourning for Laurel. Laurel’s ashes were brought to his hometown of Tanauan, Batangas on February 5 for a necrological service at St. John the Evangelist Church. His ashes were later brought to the Batangas Provincial Capitol in Batangas City for a memorial service. His ashes were interred at the Libingan ng mga Bayani in Taguig on February 6.

In addition, Arroyo awarded Laurel the grand cross of the Order of Lakandula posthumously on February 7, 2004.

Honors and awards

 :Grand Cross (Bayani) of the Order of Lakandula, 7 February 2004 (posthumous)
: Grand Cross (Dakilang Kamanong) of the Gawad Mabini, 1996
 : The Order of the Knights of Rizal, Knight Grand Cross of Rizal (KGCR).

Notes

References

External links

Official website of former Vice President Laurel
Office of the Vice President of the Philippines

|-

|-

|-

|-

|-

|-

|-

1928 births
Tagalog people
2004 deaths
Ateneo de Manila University alumni
Deaths from cancer in California
Centro Escolar University alumni
De La Salle University alumni
Deaths from lymphoma
Filipino Roman Catholics
Salvador
People from Batangas
People from Paco, Manila
Candidates in the 1992 Philippine presidential election
Prime Ministers of the Philippines
University of the Philippines alumni
Vice presidents of the Philippines
Candidates in the 1986 Philippine vice-presidential election
Senators of the 7th Congress of the Philippines
Nacionalista Party politicians
Secretaries of Foreign Affairs of the Philippines
Recipients of Gawad Mabini
Children of presidents of the Philippines
Burials at the Libingan ng mga Bayani
Corazon Aquino administration cabinet members
Presidents of the Nacionalista Party
Members of the Batasang Pambansa
People of the People Power Revolution